Sivan Sarah Klein (born ) is an Israeli model and beauty queen who represented her country at the Miss Universe 2003 pageant in Panama City, Panama after she was crowned Miss Israel 2003. She is a television and radio host.

Early life
Klein was born in Jerusalem, Israel, to an Ashkenazi Jewish family. Klein was serving as a soldier in the Israel Defense Forces during her participation in the Miss Israel pageant.

She studied law and business management at the IDC Herzliya college.

Miss Israel 2003
Sivan Klein joined the Miss Israel pageant ("Israel's Beauty Queen") in 2003, in which she won the most-coveted title Israel's Beauty Queen, replacing last year's winner Yamit Har-Noy. She won the rights to represent Israel at the Miss Universe 2003 pageant in Panama.

Miss Universe 2003
Sivan Klein flew to Panama for the Miss Universe 2003 pageant. She was a favourite to make it into the Top 15. However, she did not make the cut. She was 19 years old when she represented Israel in this pageant.

References

External links

Miss Israel 2003 at Pageantopolis
Jerusalem Post article on Sivan Klein

1984 births
Reichman University alumni
Israeli beauty pageant winners
Israeli female models
Israeli people of Romanian-Jewish descent
Israeli television personalities
Living people
Miss Israel winners
Miss Universe 2003 contestants
Models from Jerusalem
People from Jerusalem
Israeli Ashkenazi Jews